Serinhisar is a town and district of Denizli Province of Turkey.

Name
Other names include Karia (in Latin) and Kızılhisar (literally "a red castle"). The latter is the name given by the Seljuk Turks as there were brick built fortifications here. The name was changed to Serinhisar (literally "a cool castle") in 1987, apparently because red castle was too symbolic of communism.

History
The area was first settled by the Hittites in 1500 BC, and later passed into the hands of the Lydians (800 BC), Persians (546 BC), Ancient Greeks (440 BC), Ancient Macedonians (334 BC) and Romans (133 BC). When the Roman Empire was divided in 395 the area remained within the Eastern Roman Empire (Byzantine) and was then possessed by the Seljuk Turks in 1077, who ruled until 1308. Turkmens (from Oghuz Turks' Avsar and Kayi tribe) were settled in the district in this period. Seljuk rule was interrupted by the Crusades, Genghis Khan, and Timurlane, who left the area under the rule of the Germiyan dynasty, from whom it passed to the Ottoman Empire in 1429. The castle fell into ruin in the Ottoman period and was broken up for building materials, being finally demolished in 1954.

The battle of Kazıkbeli
During the Second Crusade in 1148 the French king was proceeding eastwards having crossed the Menderes River but was stalled at the pass of Kazıkbeli, near Kızılhisar, by the Seljuk armies.

Serinhisar today
Today Serinhisar is known for its leblebi (roasted chick peas), pottery, ropemaking and shoemaking. This is a rural area and its people are hospitable and warmblooded.

References

Populated places in Denizli Province
Districts of Denizli Province